The Girls of Huntington House is a 1973 television film directed by Alf Kjellin. The film is based on the 1972 novel of the same name written by Blossom Elfman.

Plot 
Anne Baldwin arrives at Huntington House, a maternity home for pregnant minors. The school's principal Doris McKenzie is initially reluctant to hire Baldwin, because she has no degree. In class, Baldwin soon finds out she is unable to get through to the teens, of whom most are rebellious and aggressive. She constantly clashes with the school's newest student, 17-year-old Sara. Sara has been forced by her parents to enter the home and has been assigned the roommate of Gail; a model student who has a snobbish, dominant mother. Sara feels Baldwin is too old-fashioned and too introverted for contemporary moral standards/values and thus does not know the contemporary meaning of love and sex.

Inspired by Sara's attempts to make her open up, Baldwin introduces a more personal, social teaching structure. From this point, she bonds with several students, including Marilyn, who gives birth to a baby. Following a fight, Sara is fed up with Huntington House and leaves. Baldwin tries to stop her, but this results in a confrontation, during which Baldwin slaps Sara. During her absence, Baldwin decides not to report her to the authorities and after Sara's return, they become friends.

Nevertheless, Sara's attitude has become worse, having become depressed and constantly announcing she will give up her baby immediately after its birth. Baldwin knows that, secretly, Sara want to keep the baby, but she is pressured by her parents to give it up. On graduation day, Gail is reluctantly taken home by her vicious mother, who feels Gail is not treated the proper way at Huntington House. Sara announces she will not give up the baby, and, encouraged by Baldwin, leaves with her boyfriend Sandy instead. Baldwin is also inspired to follow her heart and admits to her romantic feelings for widower Sam Dutton, to whom she finally commits.

Cast
Shirley Jones as Anne Baldwin
Mercedes McCambridge as Doris McKenzie
Pamela Sue Martin as Gail Dorn
William Windom as Sam Dutton
Sissy Spacek as Sara
Katherine MacGregor as Rose Beckwith

See also
 List of American films of 1973

References

External links

1973 television films
1973 films
1973 drama films
American drama television films
Films based on American novels
1970s American films
1970s English-language films